Motelomama is an extinct genus of bothremydid pleurodiran turtle that was discovered in the Ypresian Salina Group near Negritos, Peru.  The genus consists solely of type species M. olssoni.

Discovery 
It consists of a partial shell, originally described as "Podocnemis" olssoni.

References

Further reading 
 E. S. Gaffney. 1975. A revision of the side-necked turtle Taphrosphys sulcatus (Leidy) from the Cretaceous of New Jersey. American Museum Novitates (2571)1-24

Bothremydidae
Prehistoric turtle genera
Eocene turtles
Ypresian life
Paleogene Peru
Fossils of Peru
Fossil taxa described in 1931
Fossil taxa described in 2018